The Baltimore Brigade was a professional arena football team based in Baltimore, Maryland, that played in the Arena Football League (AFL) from 2017 to 2019. The team's home arena was the Royal Farms Arena. The franchise was owned by Monumental Sports & Entertainment (Ted Leonsis, chairman), which also owned the Washington Valor of the AFL, as well as the Washington Wizards of the National Basketball Association (NBA), Washington Mystics of the Women's National Basketball Association (WNBA), and Washington Capitals of the National Hockey League (NHL).

After the 2019 season, the entire league ceased operations.

History

The Arena Football League and Monumental Sports & Entertainment both announced on November 14, 2016, that it had granted an expansion franchise to begin play for the 2017 season in Baltimore. Monumental Sports & Entertainment is operated by Ted Leonsis, the majority owner, who had also previously been granted an expansion team in the Washington Valor to begin play the same season.

Although other indoor football leagues have hosted teams in Baltimore in the past (such as the Baltimore Blackbirds and Baltimore Mariners), this is the first Arena Football League franchise to be located in Baltimore, and the first in the state of Maryland since the Washington/Maryland Commandos, a charter league franchise that played in the DC suburb of Landover for its first season.

On December 14, 2016, former Los Angeles KISS coach Omarr Smith was named the team's first head coach.

On January 25, 2017, the team was officially announced as the Baltimore Brigade, named for the military history and in reference to the War of 1812 and the inspiration for the penning of the poem that would later become known as  "The Star-Spangled Banner", the U.S.A.'s national anthem.

Number 19 was never issued to any player out of respect to their late Baltimore Colts great Johnny Unitas.

On July 20, 2018, the Brigade reached their first ArenaBowl championship game, ArenaBowl XXXI, after defeating the Philadelphia Soul in the second leg of a two-game aggregate playoff series. They won the first game 57–45 and the second 53–41. In ArenaBowl XXXI, they hosted against the Washington Valor, who scored a 69–55 upset victory.

In a January 2019 interview with Forbes, Leonsis noted that the Brigade was not particularly successful in regard to finances, and that he mainly used the team and its Washington counterpart to experiment with ideas to later use with his more prominent sports properties such as the Wizards, Mystics and Capitals. After the 2019 season, the league initially announced it was ending all local team operations and looking into becoming a traveling league. However, the entire league ceased operations after the AFL filed for bankruptcy in November 2019.

As of 2022, the Brigade's field was being used by the San Diego Strike Force of the Indoor Football League.

Players

Individual awards

Coaches and personnel

Head coaches

Staff

Season-by-season results

References

External links
 Official website 

American football teams in Baltimore
 
2016 establishments in Maryland
2019 disestablishments in Maryland